Maia Sharp is an American singer and songwriter. In addition to her solo career, she has written songs for and collaborated with several country and pop musicians including Cher, Trisha Yearwood, Terri Clark, Bonnie Raitt, Edwin McCain, and Art Garfunkel.

Early life
Sharp was born in the Central Valley in California, the only child of country songwriter Randy Sharp and anthropology professor Sharon Bays. When she was four, the family moved to Los Angeles, and at the age of five she recorded her first song. By the age of twelve she played piano, saxophone, oboe, and guitar, and by her twenties she was performing her jazz/folk songs in L.A. acoustic venues. Musically, she was inspired by Bonnie Raitt, Joni Mitchell, Jackson Browne and Sting. Sharp studied music theory at California State University, Northridge and began to focus on song-writing. She came out as a lesbian at the age of 23.

Career
Sharp played her first gig in 1993. Two years later, she met music executive Miles Copeland and recorded her debut album, Hardly Glamour (1997), on his record label Ark 21. Her next album Tinderbox failed to be released when Ark 21 was incorporated into PolyGram. Three of its songs featured on Sharp's 2002 album Maia Sharp on Concord. Her 2005 album Fine Upstanding Citizen was released by Koch. 2009's Echo, released by Crooked Crown, is, according to Sharp, her most personal album to date.

During her career, Sharp has collaborated with other musicians including Lisa Loeb, Carole King, Jules Shear and Jonatha Brooke. As a songwriter, her songs have been recorded by musicians including Cher, Kim Richey, Amanda Marshall, Paul Carrack, Edwin McCain, The Dixie Chicks, Trisha Yearwood and Kathy Mattea. She collaborated with Art Garfunkel and Buddy Mondlock on the 2002 album Everything Waits to be Noticed, Garfunkel's debut as a songwriter.

Sharp contributed the track "Castaway" to the album Music from the Aisle of Lesbos, an album featuring various lesbian artists from different genres. In 2009 Sharp opened for Bonnie Raitt on several dates. She started a national concert tour in October 2009.

Discography

Solo albums
 1997: Hardly Glamour
 2002: Maia Sharp
 2005: Fine Upstanding Citizen
 2006: Eve and the Red Delicious
 2009: Echo
 2012: Change the Ending
 2015: The Dash Between the Dates
 2021: Mercy Rising

Collaborations
 2002: Everything Waits to Be Noticed (with Art Garfunkel and Buddy Mondlock)

References

External links
 

American women country singers
American country singer-songwriters
California State University, Northridge alumni
American lesbian musicians
American LGBT singers
American LGBT songwriters
Living people
Singer-songwriters from California
Year of birth missing (living people)
LGBT people from California
Lesbian singers
Lesbian songwriters
20th-century American women singers
21st-century American women singers
Country musicians from California
20th-century LGBT people
21st-century LGBT people